, abbreviated as , is a Japanese romantic comedy light novel series written by Shūichi Nimaru and illustrated by Ui Shigure. A manga adaptation with art by Ryō Itō has been serialized in Media Factory's seinen manga magazine Monthly Comic Alive since November 2019. An anime television series adaptation by Doga Kobo aired from April to June 2021.

Plot
Sueharu Maru is a seventeen-year-old high school boy who has never had a girlfriend. He lives next door to his childhood friend Kuroha Shida, a small and cute Onee-san type of girl with an outgoing character. One day, Kuroha confesses to Sueharu, but he rejects her; Sueharu only has eyes for his first love, Shirokusa Kachi, who is a beautiful idol and an award-winning author in school. Shirokusa is indifferent to all boys in school but Sueharu, which makes Sueharu think that he might have a chance. When Sueharu decides to confess his feelings, he is devastated to find out that Shirokusa already has a boyfriend. Kuroha approaches Sueharu, offering to help him get revenge on Shirokusa and her boyfriend. However it turns out that Shirokusa also has feelings for Suehara.

Characters

A former child actor. He is traumatized by his mother's death and quits acting at the peak of his fame, becoming a regular high school student at the beginning of the series. Despite his acting prowess, he is easy to read and is relatively naive when it comes to romance, making him highly susceptible to teasing by the opposite sex. 

Sueharu's childhood friend who lives next door to him. As the eldest of four sisters, she has a tendency to look after others and is socially adept. Although she wishes for Sueharu's happiness, she also knows him better than anyone else and doesn't hesitate to use that to her advantage.

An award-winning novelist and Sueharu's first love. When Sueharu entered high school, he did not recognize her at first as she had a boyish appearance as a child. She is renowned as a "cool beauty" at school due to her fame, demeanor, intelligence, and looks. Despite being cold and aloof toward most of her male classmates, she acts friendly around Sueharu after he praises her writing. 

A famous actress known for starring in the hit drama The Ideal Little Sister. Sueharu was assigned to be her mentor when he was a child actor, through which they developed a sibling-like relationship. She idolizes Sueharu and yearns for him to return to acting.

Sueharu's close friend. He enjoys watching Sueharu react to various events and often orchestrates things behind the scenes.

Shirokusa's fake boyfriend. He is a big fan of Sueharu when Sueharu was the child actor.

Shirokusa's close friend.

Shirokusa's father.

A kouhai in Sueharu's school.

Kuroha's next younger sister. She is the tallest in four sisters of Shida family.

Kuroha's second younger sister, Akane's elder twin sister.

Kuroha's youngest sister, Aoi's younger twin sister.

Shirokusa's maid who has lived with her family for years. Because of this, she and Shirokusa have a sister-like relationship. She is also classmates with Sueharu.

Production
The names of the characters are references to characters in Fire Emblem: for instance, Maru, Shida, Kachi, Kai and Maria are named after Marth, Sheeda, Catria, Cain and Maria respectively. The names of the female characters include colors: for instance, Kuroha (lit. "black feather/wing"), Shirokusa (lit. "white grass"), Momosaka (lit. "pink slope/hill"), Asagi (lit. "pale/shallow yellow"), Midori (lit. "green"), Aoi (lit. "blue-i"), Akane (lit. "red sound") and Shion (lit. "purple garden").

Media

Light novels
The series is written by Shūichi Nimaru and illustrated by Ui Shigure. ASCII Media Works has begun publishing the series under their Dengeki Bunko imprint since June 2019. A total of ten volumes have been released as of October 2022.

Manga
A manga adaptation by Ryō Itō began serialization in Media Factory's Monthly Comic Alive in November 2019, with five tankōbon volumes were published so far.

A spin-off manga series illustrated by Mutsumi Aoki titled Osananajimi ga Zettai ni Makenai Love Come: Otonari no Yon-shimai ga Zettai ni Honobono suru Nichijō ("Daily Lives Where the Four-Sister Neighbour Absolutely Will Make You Warm") began serialization in Media Factory's Monthly Comic Alive on January 27, 2021. Two tankōbon volume was published so far.

Anime
An anime television series adaptation was announced on October 3, 2020. The series was animated by Doga Kobo and directed by Takashi Naoya, with Yoriko Tomita handling series' composition. Naoya also designed the characters. It aired from April 14 to June 30, 2021 on AT-X and other channels. Riko Azuna performed the series' opening theme song "Chance! & Revenge!", while Inori Minase and Ayane Sakura performed the series' ending theme song "Senryakuteki de Yosō Funō na Love Comedy no Ending Tema Kyoku" (lit. "An Ending Theme Song for a Tactically Unpredictable Romantic Comedy"). Crunchyroll licensed the series outside of Asia. Muse Communication has licensed the series in Southeast Asia and South Asia, and will stream it on their Muse Asia YouTube channel and Bilibili. The series ran for 12 episodes.

Episode list

Reception
The light novel ranked fifth in 2020 in Takarajimasha's annual light novel guide book Kono Light Novel ga Sugoi!, in the bunkobon category. As of October 2020, over 500,000 copies have been sold.

Notes

References

External links
 
 Anime official twitter 

2019 Japanese novels
Anime and manga based on light novels
AT-X (TV network) original programming
Crunchyroll anime
Dengeki Bunko
Doga Kobo
Light novels
Media Factory manga
Muse Communication
Romantic comedy anime and manga
Seinen manga